Hingol Dam is a proposed small, low-head, Central Core Zone, hydroelectric power generation dam of 3.5 megawatt generation capacity, located in Lasbela District across Hingol River in Balochistan Province of Pakistan at a distance of  North West of Karachi and about  North of Bridge across Hingol River on Makran Coastal Highway and about  north of Kund Malir where the river falls into the sea.

Main Uses
With the construction of the proposed Hingol Dam, flood waters of Hingol River will be stored. Gross storage of the reservoir is 2.10
MAF of which an average of about 1.3 MAF water will be annually available for developing irrigated agriculture of command area of 80,000 acres. This project will produce 3.5 MW of power generation with annual energy of 4.4 GWh.

Other Benefits
Damming the flow of Hingol River will save the flood water for irrigated agriculture development, power generation and water supply for drinking and other domestic uses. The project will bring general uplift of the people in the area by creation of employment and business opportunities. These indirect benefits, such as employment opportunities and consequent rise in the living standard of the people, however cannot be quantified in monetary term. The direct receipt of the project will be available in shape of irrigation service fee (Abiana) and receipt of cost of sale of energy to consumers. The project would greatly increase the development of fisheries in the area and provide recreation and employment opportunities to the residents of the area. The estimated cost of the project will be US$311 Million. Out of which US$227 Million for civil works and US$28 Million for electro-mechanical works are required.

History
Feasibility studies for the dam were completed in 1992 however due to various reasons including financial constraints and local opposition the dam is still not constructed. In 2008, members of the Balochistan Assembly opposed the construction of the dam. The local Hindu community protested the construction of the dam as it will damage the historic Hindu temple Hinglaj Mata and would destroy the eco-system of Hingol National Park.

Protest by Hindu community
The proposed plan to build a dam in the Hingol River close to the Shri Hinglaj Mata temple shrine, which is a major Hindu pilgrimage centre in Pakistan. The dam would have flooded the accommodation roads to the temple and endangered the locality and its associated festivals. Following protest from the Hindu community the dam proposal was abandoned by the Balochistan Assembly.
 
However, the Water and Power Development Authority of Pakistan initially suggested relocating three holy places to a higher elevation and guaranteed the
construction of a new access road. This proposition was rejected by the Hinglaj Sheva Mandali, which argued that these sites were not like common temples and could not simply be relocated. In 2008, the lawmakers in the Balochistan Assembly reacted to the concerns and protests of the Hindu community and asked the federal government to stop the project. In 2009, after a year of suspension, the power and development authority chose to continue with the controversial Hingol Dam construction plans but decided to shift the site of the dam a few kilometers north in order to protect the temple. This resolution was in keeping with a consensus between the power development authority, the Balochistan Assembly, and the Hindu community.

Salient Features
Type of Dam: Central Core Zoned Dam
Maximum height of Dam:
Length of Dam:
Gross Storage Capacity: 1.3 MAF
Installed capacity: 3.5 MW
Command Area: 80,000 acres
Cropped area: 160,000 acres
Cropping Intensity: 200%
EIRR: 16.37%
B.C. Ratio: 1.45:1

Current Status
 PC-I Proforma (New Site) cleared by CDWP in its meeting held on November 19, 2009, and
cleared for approval of ECNEC.
 Detailed Engineering Design and Tender Documents of the New Site is in progress Studies of the
Project (New Site) in progress, to be completed by January 2011.
 Construction bids invited on July 11, 2011.

See also 

 List of dams and reservoirs in Pakistan
 List of power stations in Pakistan
 Khan Khwar Hydropower Project
 Satpara Dam
 Gomal Zam Dam
 Duber Khwar hydropower project

References 

Dams in Balochistan, Pakistan
Hydroelectric power stations in Pakistan
Proposed hydroelectric power stations
Proposed renewable energy power stations in Pakistan